Women: Stories of Passion is an American anthology drama series that aired on the American cable television network Showtime from August 31, 1996 until April 4, 1999. and distributed by Playboy Entertainment overseas.

The episodes were based on stories of love and passion from a woman's point of view.

Episodes

Season 1 (1996)

Season 2 (1997)

Season 3 (1999)

References

External links 
 

1990s American drama television series
1990s American anthology television series
1996 American television series debuts
1999 American television series endings
Showtime (TV network) original programming
English-language television shows
Television series by Alta Loma Entertainment